Carl Reiner was a writer, stand-up comedian, actor, and director of the stage and screen whose career spanned nearly 7 decades. His television credits include Your Show of Shows (1950–1954), Caesar's Hour (1954–1957), and The Dick Van Dyke Show (1961–1966). He also is known for his successful collaborations with Steve Martin such as The Jerk (1979), Dead Men Don't Wear Plaid (1982), and The Man with Two Brains (1983). He is also known for his standup comedy albums and television appearances with Mel Brooks.

Filmography

Film

Actor

Director
Credits from the British Film Institute.

Screenwriter

Television

Actor

Director

Writer

Theatre

References 

American filmographies